The city of Portland, Oregon, has more than  of public parks and other natural areas, including one of the largest municipal parks in the United States, Forest Park. Many are managed by Portland Parks & Recreation (PP&R). There are at least 279 parks and natural areas in Portland.

The development of Portland's park system was largely guided by the 1903 Olmsted Portland park plan.

North Portland

Northeast Portland

Northwest Portland

Southeast Portland

Southwest Portland

See also

 List of community gardens in Portland, Oregon
 Lists of Oregon-related topics
 Tourism in Portland, Oregon

References

External links

 Portland Parks & Recreation

Portland, Oregon
 
Parks in Portland, Oregon